Benjamin Aaron Boretz (born October 3, 1934) is an American composer and music theorist.

Life and work
Benjamin Boretz was born in Brooklyn, New York to Abraham Jacob Boretz and Leah (Yullis) Boretz. He graduated with a degree in music from Brooklyn College in 1954, studied composition with Tadeusz Kassern, and later studied composition at Brandeis University with Arthur Berger and Irving Fine, with Darius Milhaud at the Aspen Music Festival and School, with Lukas Foss at UCLA, and with Milton Babbitt and Roger Sessions at Princeton University. Boretz was one of the first composers to work with computer-synthesized sound (Group Variations II, 1970–72). In the late 1970s and 1980s he converged his compositional and pedagogical practices in a project of real-time improvisational music-making, culminating in the formation at Bard College of the music-learning program called Music Program Zero, which flourished until 1995. He has written extensively on musical issues, as critic, theorist, and musical philosopher, from the perspective of a practicing composer. His earliest (1970) large-scale music-intellectual essay was the book-length "Meta-Variations, Studies in the Foundations of Musical Thought," which addresses the epistemological questions involved in the cognition and composition of music, and propounds a radically relativistic/individualistic/ontological reconstruction of the musical creative process. Later, in 1978, his text composition "Language, as a Music, Six marginal Pretexts for Composition" engaged questions of the origin and nature of language and meaning as they might be conceived from the perspective of music.

Boretz has taught in the music departments of a number of American universities, including Brandeis, UCLA, UC Berkeley, Princeton University, University of Chicago, NYU, Columbia University, University of Michigan, Bard College, UC Santa Barbara, Evergreen College, and University of Southampton (UK, as a visiting Fulbright Professor). 

Boretz is a co-founder, with Arthur Berger, of the composers' music journal Perspectives of New Music and in 1988 founded (with Elaine Barkin and J. K. Randall) Open Space (publications, recordings, scores) and, in 1999, The Open Space magazine (with Mary Lee A. Roberts), which he edits with Dorota Czerner, Tildy Bayar, Jon Forshee, Dean Rosenthal, and Arthur Margolin. He was principal music critic for The Nation from 1962 to 1970.

He has two children, Avron and Nina.

Recordings
Boretz's work as composer and writer is available on CDs, DVDs, and print books issued by Open Space Publications, a cooperative formed by Boretz with Elaine Barkin and J. K. Randall.

Principal Compositions

 Concerto Grosso for String Orchestra (1954)
 Two Holy Sonnets of John Donne (1954)
 Nocturne for String Orchestra (1955)
 Partita for Piano (1955)
 Leda and the Swan (Rilke) for alto voice, 2 cellos, flute (1955)
 Divertimento for chamber ensemble (1955–56)
 Violin Concerto (1956)
 Overture to "Jezebel" (1956)
 String Quartet (1957–58)
 2 musics for lukas foss (piano 4 hands) (1957)
 Donne Songs for soprano and piano (1959)
 Group Variations I for chamber orchestra (1964–67)
 Group Variations II for computer (version 1, 1972; 2, 1994; 2.1, 2005)
 Liebeslied, for a pianist alone (unfinished)(1974)
 (“...my chart shines high where the blue milk’s upset...”) for solo piano (1976–77)
 Language, as a music / six marginal pretexts for composition for speaker, piano, prerecorded tape (1978)
 Passage, for Roger Sessions at 80 for piano (1979)
 Converge for ensemble (soundscore) (1980)
 Talk: If I am a musical thinker (paperpiece) (1982)
 Elie: The Dance (four-track tape) (1986)
 forM (a music) (four-track tape) (1986)
 to open I (four-track tape) (1986)
 please think (ensemble collage) (1986)
 to open II (piano, ensemble, tape) (1987)
 Invention (piano four hands) (1988)
 30 Inter/Play realtime sound sessions (1981–88)
 ONE, eight pianosolo soundsessions (1985)
 The River Between (2 keyboard sound session with Richard Teitelbaum) (1987)
 Sugar, Free (with Wadada Leo Smith) (1988)
 Lament for Sarah (piano soundscore) (1989)
 Scores for Composers (1988–1992)
 Dialogue for JKR (piano soundscore) (1990)
 Kivapiece, for and about John Silber (textscore)  (1991)
 The Purposes and Politics of Engaging Strangers (for 2 performers) (1991)
 gendermusic for computer (1994)
 music/consciousness/gender (live and recorded speakers, prerecorded music, video images) (1994)
 echoic/anechoic (soundscore for piano) (1997)
 Black /Noise I (for computer) (1998)
 Black /Noise III (video images, computer) (1998)
 Music, as a Music (performance piece for speaker and video) (1998(
 UN(-) for chamber orchestra (1999)
 I/O for two speakers (2001)
 O for piano (2001)
 O for electric guitar (arranged by Mary Lee Roberts) (2002)
 Ainu Dreams (piano soundscore) (2002)
 Postlude (Movement III of String Quartet) (2004-5)
 Downtime for piano and electronic percussion (2005)
 The Memory of All That. A Holy Sonnet of John Donne for Milton Babbitt (1916–2011) (2011)
 Qixingshan for String Quartet (2007–2008; 2010–2011)
 Caves (with dorota czerner) (2009)
 St. Andrews' Night (with dorota czerner) (2011)
 fireflies (with dorota czerner) (2012)
 With respect to George (a postcard for George Quasha at 70) for vibraphone solo (2012)
 ("...The sun poured molten glass on the fields...") for piano (for Robert Morris at 70) (2014)
  Fantasy on an improvisation by Jim Randall (in memoriam jkr) for the Cygnus Ensemble (2014)
  Looking (electronic) for images by Linda Cassidy (2016–17)
  One on One for solo clarinet (2017)
  A Question, A Rose for violin alone (2018)

Principal writings (published)
Books:

 Language, as a music. Six marginal pretexts for composition. for speaker, prerecorded tape, and piano (1978). Lingua Press, 1980
 Talk: If I am a musical thinker. (1980) Station Hill Press, 1984
 Music Columns from The Nation, 1962–70; selected and edited, and with an introduction by, Elaine Barkin. Open Space Publications, 1988
 Meta-Variations. Studies in the Foundations of Musical Thought. (1970) Open Space Publications, 1994
 Being About Music. Textworks 1960-2003 (with J. K. Randall). Volume 1: 1960-1978; Volume II: 1978-2003. Open Space Publications, 2003
 Inside in...outside out. Edited by Tildy Bayar. Introduction by David Lidov. Afterwords by Charles Stein, John Rahn, Joshua Banks Mailman, Jon Forshee, Robert Morris (composer), Arthur Margolin and Scott Gleason, Dorota Czerner. Open Space Publications, 2020

Articles published: in journals: The Open Space Magazine; Musical America; Musical Quarterly; Harper's; The Nation; Perspectives of New Music; Journal of Philosophy; Cimaise; the London Magazine; Journal of Music Theory; Contemporary Music Newsletter; Proceedings of the American Society of University Composers; Proceedings of the International Musicological Society; News of Music;
in books: Perspectives on Contemporary Music Theory (W. W. Norton); Perspectives on Musical Aesthetics (W. W. Norton).

References

External links
 Open Space: The Open Space Magazine

1934 births
20th-century classical composers
21st-century classical composers
American male classical composers
American classical composers
American music theorists
Aspen Music Festival and School alumni
Bard College faculty
Living people
Pupils of Arthur Berger
Pupils of Darius Milhaud
Pupils of Lukas Foss
Pupils of Milton Babbitt
Pupils of Roger Sessions
21st-century American composers
20th-century American composers
20th-century American male musicians
Brooklyn College alumni